Go KL City Bus (styled as GOKL CityBus) is a free bus service in the city centre of Kuala Lumpur, Malaysia. Previously managed by Land Public Transport Commission (SPAD), the services were taken over by Kuala Lumpur City Hall (DBKL) by 1 January 2019.

History 
The free service were introduced by SPAD to help users save money by allowingthems to move around Kuala Lumpurath no cost. Kuala Lumpur City Centre, Bukit Bintang and Chinatown areas are the first places to enjoy the service since it was launched on 31 August 2012 with 2 routes, namely the Purple and Green Lines.

On 1 May 2014, the free service has added new routes, namely Red and Blue Lines, covering Chow Kit, Kampung Baru, KL Sentral and Bukit Bintang, thus making four different circular city routes that can be identified by the colour of the routes.

By 1 January 2019, the service was taken over by Kuala Lumpur City Hall due to the termination of SPAD in 2018. Since then, the service now focuses on the feeder routes to help low-income users commute easily between residential areas and business centres or stations. The Orange Line was the first feeder route to be introduced on 28 February 2019, followed by the Pink Line in April 2019 and the Turquoise line in October 2019, all launched by Khalid Abdul Samad. The Maroon Line was introduced in August 2020, followed by the Chocolate Line in February 2021, both launched by Annuar Musa.

On 27 October 2021, it was announced by Shahidan Kassim that electric buses would be deployed in the bus services as a carbon reduction initiative and two new routes will be introduced, namely the Parrot Green and Grey lines. Both routes started operations in November 2021.

Open to residents and tourists, these services can be used at the GoKL City Bus official bus stop. Most bus stops are in close proximity to tourist attractions, major shopping centers, residential areas and easy way to connect through rail transit services such as KTM Komuter, Rapid KL and ERL.

Bus routes
All buses make a circular one-way route clockwise based on Go KL route map. These routes are not parallel with the bus route with a fare such as Rapid KL buses to avoid competition on passenger load. Therefore, GoKL City Bus passengers are intended for travelling within the Central Business District (CBD) and residential areas, saving money and looking for a free ride.

Fleet

Current 

 Yutong ZK6126HG (Causeway Link) - 40 buses (1 November 2021 - )
 SKS LEC-300 (Causeway Link, SKSBus) - 40 buses (1 November 2021 - )
 SKS Electric Bus (SKSBus) - 1 bus (1 November 2021 - )

Currently, the fleet consist of 40 Yutong ZK6126HG buses, managed by Causeway Link (Handal Indah), and 40 SKS LEC-300 buses, managed by both Causeway Link and SKSBus. The buses were painted with green and turquoise colour in line with the new DBKL initiative for a greener mode of transportation. The SKS Electric Bus entered service on 1 November 2021 on the Chocolate Line, and will replace all diesel buses by stages until early 2023.

Former 
 King Long XMQ6121G (Rapid KL) - 20 buses (31 August 2012 - 31 July 2015)
 Daewoo BV120MA (CityLiner) - 20 buses (1 May 2014 - 31 July 2015)
 Scania K250UB (Rapid KL) - 40 buses (1 August 2015 - 31 October 2021)
 Alexander Dennis Enviro200 (Rapid KL) - 20 buses (1 August 2015 - 1 May 2021)
 Scania K270UB (Rapid KL) - 20 buses (28 August 2020 - 31 October 2021)

Previously, the fleet consisted of King Long XMQ6121G buses from Rapid KL for the Green and Purple Lines, and Daewoo BV120MA NGV buses from Konsortium Transnasional for the Red and Blue Lines, painted in purple and pink livery. These buses were replaced on 1 August 2015 with Scania K-series and Alexander Dennis Enviro200 buses. Usually, the Enviro200 buses served the Blue and Red Lines, the Scania K270 buses served the Maroon and Chocolate Lines, and the Scania K250 buses served the rest, though the Scania K250 buses would also serve the other lines during rush hours. The buses were used until 31 October 2021, where all GoKL operations were transferred to Causeway Link and SKSBus. All the buses were returned to the respective operators and repainted to be redeployed on normal services.

Operation hours and bus frequency 
Monday to Sunday: 6.00am - 11.00pm
The frequency of buses is expected to be in 5 to 15 minutes for city routes, and in 30 minutes for feeder routes, depending on the traffic. For people with disabilities, each bus has a wheelchair access ramp.

See also
 List of free public transport routes (Worldwide)
 Free public transport
 Free travel pass

References

2012 establishments in Malaysia
Bus transport in Kuala Lumpur
Zero-fare transport services